Zenzi by Realfood was a Norwegian fast food chain store. The word "Zenzi" originated from the English word "sensible" and "zenith", which refers to "peak" or "altitude" and the Japanese word "zen" which means "good", "real" and "complete". The store was founded by the Norwegian chefs Rune Pal and Øystein Reinsborg.

Zenzi went into bankruptcy proceedings in February 2009.

Fast food
Restaurant chains in Norway